Rox or ROX may refer to:
 Rox (album), an album by California punk band Supernova
 Rox (singer), London-based singer
 Rox (American TV series)
 ROX (Belgian TV series)
 Rox, Nevada, a ghost town
 Roxithromycin, sold under the trade name ROX
 ROX Desktop, a Unix desktop environment based on the ROX-Filer file manager
 Rox Jewellers (retailer), in the United Kingdom
 Brockton Rox, a minor league baseball team in Brockton, Massachusetts
 St. Cloud Rox (minor league baseball), a team in St. Cloud, Minnesota, that played from 1946 to 1971
 St. Cloud Rox (collegiate summer baseball), a team in St. Cloud, Minnesota, since 1997
 The Rox, a renamed Ellis Island in the Wild Cards book series
 "Rox", a song by Scottish band The Aliens from the album Astronomy for Dogs
 The Rox, a nickname for the Colorado Rockies
 The Rox, a nickname for the Houston Rockets
 Rox, a model of bicycle computer made by Sigma Sport
 Rox, the currency in the children's online game Moshi Monsters
 ROX is the ticker symbol and shorthand nomer for Castle Brands
 Rox, a main character in the animated television series Sunny Day
 Rox, a cosmetic outfit in Fortnite Battle Royale
 Rox, a videogame released in 1998 for Sega Saturn and in 2003 for PlayStation
 Roxburghshire, historic county in Scotland, Chapman code